Ochyrotica zolotuhini is a moth of the family Pterophoridae. It is found in Vietnam.

The wingspan is 16–18 mm. The head is covered with brown upright hair. The antennae are slender and pale brown and the thorax is glossy silver. There is a broad white band located on the forewings there, broadening closer to the apex, where it forms irregular triangle. The hindwings are uniform brown and the fringe on both wings is brown.

Etymology
The species is named after the Russian lepidopterologist Vadim Zolotukhin.

References

Moths described in 2010
Ochyroticinae